Cold Springs Dam is an earthen dam  northeast of Hermiston and  south of the Columbia River in Umatilla County, Oregon.

The dam impounds the water of the Umatilla River to create Cold Springs Reservoir, a component of the Umatilla Basin Project of the United States Bureau of Reclamation. Dating from 1908, the first generation of the bureau's projects in the American west, the reservoir supplies irrigation water for local agriculture in this arid and seasonally-cold desert region. The nearby 1927 McKay Dam and McKay Reservoir are part of the same water management project.

The reservoir also overlays the Cold Springs National Wildlife Refuge, established in 1909.

References

External links
Historic American Engineering Record (HAER) documentation, filed under Hermiston, Umatilla County, OR:

Dams in Oregon
Reservoirs in Oregon
Buildings and structures in Umatilla County, Oregon
United States Bureau of Reclamation dams
Dams completed in 1908
1908 establishments in Oregon
Historic American Engineering Record in Oregon
Lakes of Umatilla County, Oregon